Omata was a New Zealand electorate. It was located in Taranaki and based on the township of Omata. One of the original 24 electorates, it existed from 1853 to 1870.

Population centres
The Omata electorate was named after Omata in Taranaki, a locality just south-west of New Plymouth. The electorate's boundary was a straight line that started at the coast between Omata and New Plymouth, and it proceeded in a south-east direction to near where Patea is located. Population centres located in the electorate included Ōpunake, Manaia, Hāwera, and Eltham. In the 1870 electoral redistribution, the Omata electorate was abolished. The electorate's area was effectively increased towards the east (the easternmost boundary reached the Whanganui River), gaining a large area from the Grey and Bell electorate, and the name changed to  after Mount Egmont, the original European name of Mount Taranaki.

History
The Omata electorate was one of the twenty-four original electorates, used in New Zealand's first general election. In 1853, William Crompton was returned elected unopposed. East resigned in March 1860 before the end of his term when he accepted a government appointment. In the resulting by-election on 16 April 1860, James Crowe Richmond was returned unopposed.

Members of Parliament

The following Members of Parliament represented the Omata electorate:

Election results

1853 election
William Crompton was returned unopposed.

1855 election

1860 by-election
James Crowe Richmond was returned unopposed.

1868 by-election
Charles Brown was returned unopposed.(see ).

1870 by-election

Notes

References 

Historical electorates of New Zealand
Politics of Taranaki
1853 establishments in New Zealand
1870 disestablishments in New Zealand